USS Antelope is a name used more than once by the U.S. Navy:

 , a chartered stern-wheel steamer built in 1861.
 , a cargo ship launched on 6 July 1943.
 , was an aluminum patrol boat launched 4 November 1967.

References 
 

United States Navy ship names